Hiroshi Fukumura (福村博) (born February 21, 1949, Tokyo) is a Japanese jazz trombonist.

Fukumura played with Sadao Watanabe for much of the 1970s, excepting a period where he studied in the United States at the New England Conservatory of Music. He led his own quintet, which included Shigeharu Mukai as a sideman, for a studio recording and a live release in 1973. He was a member of Native Son and also worked with Takehiro Honda, Gil Evans, Hidefumi Toki, and others.

Discography
Morning Flight (Three Blind Mice, 1973)
Live:First Flight (Trio Records, 1973)
Hunt Up Wind with Sadao Watanabe (Flying Disk, 1978)
Nice Day (Insights, 1981)
Hot Shot (Morning, 1985)

References

1949 births
Japanese jazz trombonists
Musicians from Tokyo
Living people